WSYT (channel 68) is a television station in Syracuse, New York, United States, affiliated with the Fox network and owned by Imagicomm Communications. The station's studios are located on James Street/NY 290 in Syracuse's Near Northeast section, and its transmitter is located near Maple Grove, a hamlet of Otisco.

WSYT operates a third digital subchannel affiliated with MyNetworkTV which brands as "My 43". It uses virtual channel 43.1, formerly utilized by separately-licensed WNYS-TV until January 2020, when then-owner Cox Media Group turned in WNYS-TV's license and merged its subchannels onto WSYT's spectrum as a condition of the 2019 acquisition of Northwest Broadcasting by Apollo Global Management.

WNYS-CD (channel 16) in Ithaca operates as a Class A translator of WSYT; this station's transmitter is located on the Ithaca College campus, along NY 96B in Eastern South Hill.

History
The station was originally assigned the call letters WKAF and was on UHF channel 62 rather than 68. After being reassigned to channel 68, the owners of WKAF (Channel 62 Inc.) got the station on-the-air February 15, 1986, and the outlet aired religious programming for three hours a day. The station was sold to The Flatley Company in late-1986 at which point construction of its facility on James Street in Syracuse began. WSYT began full-time operation on April 5, 1987 with a general entertainment format of cartoons, classic sitcoms, recent sitcoms, movies, drama shows, and sports. The launch of WSYT coincided with the prime time launch of the Fox network of which the station has been an affiliate ever since. For the first six months of the network's operations, the network's programming (which only consisted of a late-night program at the time) was not available over-the-air in the Syracuse market.

Flatley owned WSYT until 1992 when the station was sold to Encore Communications, later known as Max Media Properties. In 1998, the Sinclair Broadcast Group bought the station. That company entered into a local marketing agreement with UPN affiliate WNYS-TV in 1995 and began operating that station out of WSYT's studios. It was carried on cable in the Kingston, Ontario area until 2009. That market is currently served by WNYF-CD in Watertown (for over-the-air ATSC viewers) and on cable by WUTV in Buffalo and WUHF in Rochester.

Like other Sinclair-owned stations in the region, WSYT and WNYS-TV have been transmitting digital-only signals since February 17, 2009. Until August 2008, WSYT had the highest analog channel allocation of any Fox associated television station before being eclipsed by KSWB-TV in San Diego, California when that station swapped its CW affiliation with XETV. WSYT's analog power was limited to 1,000,000 watts due to its proximity to Canada. Until June 12, 2009 (the official day of the digital television transition in the United States), UHF analog stations in the country were licensed to transmit up to 5,000,000 watts. All of this changed back on February 17, 2009, when WSYT went digital-only and moved to a less power-hungry transmitter on UHF channel 19.

From 1987 through 2003, WSYT owned the local broadcast rights to Syracuse University men's basketball games when rights were acquired by Time Warner Cable (now Charter Spectrum) and began airing on their local sports channel. During the majority of those years, WSYT produced a live post-game show as well as a weekly basketball coach's show with Jim Boeheim. They also acquired the rights to Big East football in the 1990s and would air a post-game show after a Syracuse Orangemen game was shown. The coverage was expanded to include a football coach's show with Paul Pasqualoni and a football preview show hosted by Steve Hyder and Joe Zone. In the late-1980s, WSYT aired New York Yankees games that were produced and broadcast by WPIX in New York City.

On May 15, 2012, Sinclair and Fox agreed to a five-year extension to the network's affiliation agreement with Sinclair's nineteen Fox stations (including WSYT) allowing them to continue carrying the network's programming through 2017. In a YouTube video posted by WBFF in Baltimore in July 2012, it was revealed that WSYT would air Jeopardy! and Wheel of Fortune beginning September 17, 2012. WSYT is one of a handful of Fox affiliates to air the game shows along with WBFF, WXIX-TV in Cincinnati, WVUE-DT in New Orleans, WLUK-TV in Green Bay, KDVR in Denver, KVHP in Lake Charles, Louisiana, WALA-TV in Mobile, WLUC-DT2 in Marquette, Michigan, and WDAF-TV in Kansas City.

Sinclair announced the sale of WSYT, the LMA for WNYS-TV, and WYZZ-TV in Peoria–Bloomington, Illinois to Cunningham Broadcasting on February 28, 2013 following its acquisition of Barrington Broadcasting. The sale was necessary due to the Federal Communications Commission (FCC)'s ownership rules as Sinclair chose to keep Barrington's WSTM-TV in Syracuse. However, in an updated filing with the FCC, it was revealed that WSYT would instead be sold to Bristlecone Broadcasting, a company owned by Brian Brady, owner of Northwest Broadcasting. Those transactions were completed on November 25. Following the consummation of the sale, Sinclair continued to operate WSYT and WNYS-TV through a transitional service agreement for six months until May 2014. Sinclair will continue to own the station's studios on James Street and its transmitter site in Otisco for at least ten years. Bristlecone Broadcasting was incorporated into the Northwest Broadcasting corporate structure in a May 2015 restructuring of Brady's broadcast holdings, making WSYT and WNYS sister stations to WICZ-TV and WBPN-LP in Binghamton.

In 2019, Northwest Broadcasting was in turn acquired by Apollo Global Management, and was to be merged into a new group known as Terrier Media with another AGM acquisition, Cox Media Group. After expanding its purchase to include CMG's radio and advertising units, it was announced that the combined group would retain the Cox Media Group name.

On March 29, 2022, Cox Media Group announced it would sell WSYT and 17 other stations to Imagicomm Communications, an affiliate of the parent company of the INSP cable channel, for $488 million; the sale was completed on August 1.

Newscasts
From 1996 until 2000 through a news share agreement, NBC affiliate WSTM-TV produced a 30-minute prime time newscast on WSYT called Fox 68 News at 10. After WSTM-TV declined to renew the arrangement, WSYT then established a new outsourcing agreement with CBS outlet WTVH. As a result, a new nightly news program began airing on the station with the name Fox 68 Eyewitness News at 10. Eventually, an hour-long weekday morning show (also produced by WTVH) debuted and was called Fox 68 Eyewitness News at 7. Both of the programs featured the same branding as WTVH's newscasts did at the time.

Meanwhile, in 2003, in order to offer competition in the 10 o'clock slot, WSTM-TV brought back its own half-hour newscast for newly acquired sister station WSTQ-LP that was seen only on weeknights. In April 2006, WTVH ceased producing all local news programming for WSYT in order to focus on its own newscasts that were cemented in third place by this point. Ironically, the nightly 10 o'clock broadcasts were WTVH's most successful having soundly beat WSTM-TV's effort on WSTQ-LP in the ratings. Since dropping news programming from the CBS outlet, WSYT remains one of a handful of big four network-affiliated stations throughout the United States (and the largest Fox station in terms of market size, since former sister station WUTV in Buffalo, the previous largest market with a non-news Fox affiliate, added newscasts in 2013) that does not operate its own news department or air local newscasts through a partnership with a big three station.

Technical information

Subchannels
The station's digital signal is multiplexed:

On November 1, 2010, WSYT launched The Country Network on its second digital subchannel replacing a standard definition simulcast of its primary channel.

Translator

Analog-to-digital conversion
WSYT shut down its analog signal, over UHF channel 68, on February 17, 2009, the original date in which full-power television stations in the United States were to transition from analog to digital broadcasts under federal mandate (which was later pushed back to June 12, 2009). The station's digital signal remained on its pre-transition UHF channel 19. Through the use of PSIP, digital television receivers display the station's virtual channel as its former UHF analog channel 68, which was among the high band UHF channels (52-69) that were removed from broadcasting use as a result of the transition.

References

External links
WSYT "Fox 68"
Information for WNYS-CD: , 

Television channels and stations established in 1986
SYT
Fox network affiliates
Cozi TV affiliates
1986 establishments in New York (state)
Imagicomm Communications